KPOP (94.3 FM) is a radio station licensed to serve the community of Hartshorne, Oklahoma. The station is owned by Heartbeat Oklahoma LLC. It airs a contemporary Christian format.

The station was assigned the KPOP call letters by the Federal Communications Commission on August 14, 2015.

The station 100.3 is called Faith 100.3 format is Country and Southern Gospel Music. Listen live at https://streamdb9web.securenetsystems.net/cirrusencore/KPOPHD2.

Translator

References

External links
 Official Website
 
 
 

POP (FM)
Radio stations established in 2015
2015 establishments in Oklahoma
Contemporary Christian radio stations in the United States
Pittsburg County, Oklahoma